
Włocławek County is a unit of territorial administration and local government (powiat) in Kuyavian-Pomeranian Voivodeship, north-central Poland. It came into being on January 1, 1999, as a result of the Polish local government reforms passed in 1998. Its administrative seat is the city of Włocławek, although the city is not part of the county (it constitutes a separate city county).

As of 2019 its total population is 86,131, out of which the population of Brześć Kujawski is 4,642, that of Kowal is 3,479, that of Lubraniec is 2,999, that of Izbica Kujawska is 2,609, that of Chodecz is 1,894, that of Lubień Kujawski is 1,391, and the rural population is 69,117.

Neighbouring counties
Apart from the city of Włocławek, Włocławek County is also bordered by Lipno County to the north, Płock County to the east, Gostynin County to the south-east, Kutno County and Koło County to the south, Radziejów County to the west, and Aleksandrów County to the north-west.

Administrative division
The county is subdivided into 13 gminas (one urban, five urban-rural and seven rural). These are listed in the following table, in descending order of population.

Roads 

Highway
Autostrada A1/E75

Country Roads
 Country Road 1/E75
 Country Road 62
 Country Road 67

References

 
Land counties of Kuyavian-Pomeranian Voivodeship